The Church of Saint Nicholas is a church of the Serbian Orthodox Church, located in the village of Kosovica near Ivanjica. The original church dates back to the Middle Ages. The present structure is believed to have been built in the 19th century upon the foundations of an old church. According to tradition, the original building was built after the Battle of Kosovo, in memory of the soldiers who passed through the area whilst withdrawing after their defeat in 1389.

Architecture
The church is a single-naved basilica with a large semi-circular sanctuary apse. It was built in rubble and has a barrel vault. The roof is covered with shingles. Inside the church, poorly preserved parts of the iconostasis which belonged to an earlier church can be seen; the most prominent among them is the despotic icon of Jesus Christ and a crucifix.

Gallery

References

External links

Serbian Orthodox church buildings in Serbia
19th-century Serbian Orthodox church buildings
Ivanjica